Torradovirus is a genus of viruses in the order Picornavirales, in the family Secoviridae. Plants serve as natural hosts. There are six species in this genus. Diseases associated with this genus include: torrado disease: severe necrosis of leaves and fruits.

Taxonomy
The genus contains the following species:
 Carrot torradovirus 1
 Lettuce necrotic leaf curl virus
 Motherwort yellow mottle virus
 Squash chlorotic leaf spot virus
 Tomato marchitez virus
 Tomato torrado virus

Structure
Viruses in Torradovirus are non-enveloped, with icosahedral geometries, and T=pseudo3 symmetry. The diameter is around 30 nm. Genomes are linear and segmented, bipartite, around 25.4kb in length.

Life cycle
Viral replication is cytoplasmic. Entry into the host cell is achieved by penetration into the host cell. Replication follows the positive stranded RNA virus replication model. Positive stranded RNA virus transcription is the method of transcription. The virus exits the host cell by tubule-guided viral movement.
Plants serve as the natural host. The virus is transmitted via a vector (whitefly). Transmission routes are vector and mechanical.

References

External links
 Viralzone: Torradovirus
 ICTV

Secoviridae
Virus genera